Newry, Mourne and Down District Council (Irish: Comhairle Ceantair an Iúir, Mhúrn agus an Dúin) is a local authority in Northern Ireland that was established on 1 April 2015. It replaces Down District Council and Newry and Mourne District Council and covers most of the southeast of Northern Ireland. The first elections to the authority were on 22 May 2014. At the 2019 Northern Ireland local elections, Sinn Féin became the largest party with 16 seats.

Chairpersonship

Chairperson

Deputy Chairperson

Councillors
For the purpose of elections the council is divided into seven district electoral areas (DEA):

Party strengths

Councillors by electoral area

† Co-opted to fill a vacancy since the election.‡ New party affiliation since the election.Last updated 22 December 2022.

For further details see 2019 Newry, Mourne and Down District Council election.

Bilingualism policy
The former Newry & Mourne District Council, uniquely among local authorities in Northern Ireland, has a bilingual policy which sets out the Council’s commitment to facilitate and encourage the promotion and use of both the Irish language and the English language in the Council area. In order to ensure that the new administrative division does not constitute an obstacle to the promotion of the Irish language, Newry, Mourne and Down District Council was obliged under the terms of Article 7.1 (b) of the European Charter for Regional or Minority Languages, to progressively implement the bilingual policy throughout the whole of the newly enlarged district.

Population
The area covered by the new Council has a population of 171,533 residents according to the 2011 Northern Ireland census.

References

2015 establishments in Northern Ireland
District councils of Northern Ireland
Government agencies established in 2015
Politics of County Armagh
Politics of County Down